The 5th PGA Golden Laurel Awards, honoring the best film and television producers of 1993, were presented at the Beverly Wilshire Hotel in Los Angeles, California on March 2, 1994 after the winners were announced in February. The ceremony was hosted by Michael Douglas and the nominees were announced on January 19, 1994.

Winners and nominees

Film

Television

Special

References

 1993
1993 film awards
1993 television awards